The Arlit mine is a large mine located near Arlit, in the northern part of Niger in Agadez Region. Arlit represents one of the largest uranium reserves in Niger having estimated reserves of 47.5 million tonnes of ore grading 0.014% uranium.

References 

Uranium mines in Niger